Paracymoriza pseudovagalis is a moth in the family Crambidae. It was described by Fu-Qiang Chen, Shi-Mei Song and Chun-Sheng Wu in 2007. It is found in Jiangxi, China.

References

Acentropinae
Moths described in 2007